Panagiota Tsitsela (born August 1, 1972) is a retired Greek rhythmic gymnast.

She competed for Greece in the rhythmic gymnastics all-around competition at the 1988 Summer Olympics in Seoul. She tied for 35th place in the qualification round and didn't advance to the final.

References 

1972 births
Living people
Greek rhythmic gymnasts
Gymnasts at the 1988 Summer Olympics
Olympic gymnasts of Greece